Late Hour Special is an album by saxophonist Gene Ammons compiling sessions recorded in 1961 and 1962 and released on the Prestige label in 1964.

Reception
Allmusic awarded the album 3 stars with its review by Scott Yanow stating, "Ammons is the main star throughout... infusing each tune with soul and swing. A fine outing, although with brief (35 & 1/2 minutes) playing time".

Track listing 
 "The Party's Over" (Betty Comden, Adolph Green, Jule Styne) - 5:42     
 "I Want to Be Loved (But Only by You)" (Savannah Churchill) - 3:57     
 "Things Ain't What They Used to Be" (Mercer Ellington, Ted Persons) - 4:28     
 "Lascivious" (Gene Ammons) - 4:27     
 "Makin' Whoopee" (Walter Donaldson, Gus Kahn) - 5:00     
 "Soft Winds" (Benny Goodman) - 5:48     
 "Lullaby of the Leaves" (Bernice Petkere, Joe Young) - 5:34  
Recorded at Van Gelder Studio in Englewood Cliffs New Jersey on June 13, 1961 (tracks 2, 3, 5 & 7) and September 5, 1962 (tracks 1, 4 & 6)

Personnel 
Gene Ammons - tenor saxophone [Quartet tracks with Patti Bown (tracks 1, 4 & 6); Big Band tracks with Richard Wyands (2, 3, 5 & 7)] 
Hobart Dotson, Clark Terry - trumpet (tracks 2, 3, 5 & 7) 
Oliver Nelson - alto saxophone, arranger (tracks 2, 3, 5 & 7)
George Barrow, Red Holloway - tenor saxophone (tracks 2, 3, 5 & 7)
Bob Ashton - baritone saxophone (tracks 2, 3, 5 & 7)  
Patti Bown (tracks 1, 4 & 6), Richard Wyands (tracks 2, 3, 5 & 7) - piano
George Duvivier (tracks 1, 4 & 6), Wendell Marshall (tracks 2, 3, 5 & 7) - bass
Walter Perkins (tracks 1, 4 & 6), Bill English (tracks 2, 3, 5 & 7) - drums
Ray Barretto - congas (tracks 2, 3, 5 & 7)

References 

Gene Ammons albums
1964 albums
Prestige Records albums
Albums produced by Esmond Edwards
Albums recorded at Van Gelder Studio